Belgium participated in the Eurovision Song Contest 2015 with the song "Rhythm Inside" written by Loïc Nottet and Beverly Jo Scott. The song was performed by Loïc Nottet, who was internally selected by the Walloon broadcaster Radio Télévision Belge de la Communauté Française (RTBF) in November 2014 to represent the nation at the 2015 contest in Vienna, Austria. The song, "Rhythm Inside", was presented to the public on 10 March 2015.

Belgium was drawn to compete in the first semi-final of the Eurovision Song Contest which took place on 19 May 2015. Performing during the show in position 3, "Rhythm Inside" was announced among the top 10 entries of the first semi-final and therefore qualified to compete in the final on 23 May. It was later revealed that Belgium placed second out of the 16 participating countries in the semi-final with 149 points. In the final, Belgium performed in position 13 and placed fourth out of the 27 participating countries, scoring 217 points. This was Belgium's best result in the contest since their second place in 2003.

Background

Prior to the 2015 contest, Belgium had participated in the Eurovision Song Contest fifty-six times since its debut as one of seven countries to take part in 1956. Since then, the country has won the contest on one occasion in 1986 with the song "J'aime la vie" performed by Sandra Kim. Following the introduction of semi-finals for 2004, Belgium had been featured in only three finals. In 2014, Axel Hirsoux represented the country with the song "Mother", placing fourteenth in the first semi-final and failing to advance to the final.

The Belgian broadcaster for the 2015 contest, who broadcasts the event in Belgium and organises the selection process for its entry, was Radio Télévision Belge de la Communauté Française (RTBF). The Belgian participation in the contest alternates between two broadcasters: the Flemish Vlaamse Radio- en Televisieomroeporganisatie (VRT) and the Walloon RTBF. Both broadcasters have selected the Belgian entry using national finals and internal selections in the past. In 2013, RTBF internally selected a contestant from the reality singing competition The Voice Belgique to represent the nation and organised a national final in order to select the song, while in 2014, VRT organised the national final Eurosong in order to select the Belgian entry. On 3 June 2014, RTBF confirmed Belgium's participation in the 2015 Eurovision Song Contest and internally selected both the artist and song.

Before Eurovision

Internal selection
The Belgian entry for the 2015 Eurovision Song Contest was selected via an internal selection by RTBF. On 3 November 2014, the broadcaster announced that they had selected Loïc Nottet to represent Belgium in Vienna. Nottet was the runner-up in the third series of the reality singing competition The Voice Belgique. On 10 March 2015, RTBF held a press conference at the Maison de Vienne in Brussels where it was announced that Loïc Nottet would perform "Rhythm Inside" at the contest. The song was written by Loïc Nottet himself along with his coach Beverly Jo Scott in The Voice Belgique, and was selected by RTBF together with Nottet's record company Sony Music Entertainment. "Rhythm Inside" was presented to the public on the same day during the VivaCité radio programmes Le 8/9 and Le 5 à 7, while the official music video, directed by Josh Brandão and Nicolai Kornum at the BlitzWerk studio in London, was broadcast as well on the same day before one of the live shows of the fourth series of The Voice Belgique on La Une.

Promotion 
Loïc Nottet's pre-contest promotion for "Rhythm Inside" was focused in Belgium with television and radio appearances. The first live televised performance of the song occurred during the 6 May broadcast of the fourth series of The Voice Belgique on La Une.

At Eurovision 

According to Eurovision rules, all nations with the exceptions of the host country and the "Big Five" (France, Germany, Italy, Spain and the United Kingdom) are required to qualify from one of two semi-finals in order to compete for the final; the top ten countries from each semi-final progress to the final. In the 2015 contest, Australia also competed directly in the final as an invited guest nation. The European Broadcasting Union (EBU) split up the competing countries into five different pots based on voting patterns from previous contests, with countries with favourable voting histories put into the same pot. On 26 January 2015, a special allocation draw was held which placed each country into one of the two semi-finals, as well as which half of the show they would perform in. Belgium was placed into the first semi-final, to be held on 19 May 2015, and was scheduled to perform in the first half of the show.

Once all the competing songs for the 2015 contest had been released, the running order for the semi-finals was decided by the shows' producers rather than through another draw, so that similar songs were not placed next to each other. Belgium was set to perform in position 3, following the entry from Armenia and before the entry from the Netherlands.

The two semi-finals and the final was broadcast in Belgium by both the Flemish and Walloon broadcasters. VRT broadcast the shows on één and Radio 2 with commentary in Dutch by Peter Van de Veire and Eva Daeleman. RTBF televised the shows on La Une with commentary in French by Jean-Louis Lahaye and Maureen Louys. The final was also broadcast by RTBF on VivaCité with commentary in French by Olivier Gilain. The Belgian spokesperson, who announced the Belgian votes during the final, was Walid.

Semi-final
Loïc Nottet took part in technical rehearsals on 11 and 15 May, followed by dress rehearsals on 18 and 19 May. This included the jury show on 18 May where the professional juries of each country watched and voted on the competing entries.

The Belgian performance featured Loïc Nottet dressed in a black suit and five backing vocalists dressed in white costumes. The staging concept involved the contrasts of black and white with strobe lighting added and the LED screens transitioning between full white displays, moving white lines and pulsating 3D boxes. Nottet and the backing vocalists performed a choreographed routine that at one point featured Nottet lying on the stage floor. The five backing vocalists that joined Loïc Nottet on stage during the performance were: Katie Bernstein, Michael Storrs, Susanna Cork, Sarah Covey and Nicolas Dorian. Nicolas Dorian previously represented Belgium in 2011 as part of Witloof Bay, while Susanna Cork would go on to represent the United Kingdom in 2018 under the pseudonym SuRie.

At the end of the show, Belgium was announced as having finished in the top ten and subsequently qualifying for the grand final. It was later revealed that Belgium placed second in the semi-final, receiving a total of 149 points.

Final
Shortly after the first semi-final, a winners' press conference was held for the ten qualifying countries. As part of this press conference, the qualifying artists took part in a draw to determine which half of the grand final they would subsequently participate in.  This draw was done in the order the countries were announced during the semi-final. Belgium was drawn to compete in the first half. Following this draw, the shows' producers decided upon the running order of the final, as they had done for the semi-finals. Belgium was subsequently placed to perform in position 13, following the entry from Australia and before the entry from Austria.

Loïc Nottet once again took part in dress rehearsals on 22 and 23 May before the final, including the jury final where the professional juries cast their final votes before the live show. Loïc Nottet performed a repeat of his semi-final performance during the final on 23 May. At the conclusion of the voting, Belgium finished in fourth place with 217 points.

Voting
Voting during the three shows consisted of 50 percent public televoting and 50 percent from a jury deliberation. The jury consisted of five music industry professionals who were citizens of the country they represent, with their names published before the contest to ensure transparency. This jury was asked to judge each contestant based on: vocal capacity; the stage performance; the song's composition and originality; and the overall impression by the act. In addition, no member of a national jury could be related in any way to any of the competing acts in such a way that they cannot vote impartially and independently. The individual rankings of each jury member were released shortly after the grand final.

Following the release of the full split voting by the EBU after the conclusion of the competition, it was revealed that Belgium had placed fourth with the public televote and fifth with the jury vote in the final. In the public vote, Belgium scored 195 points, while with the jury vote, Belgium scored 186 points. In the first semi-final, Belgium placed third with the public televote with 112 points and second with the jury vote, scoring 139 points.

Below is a breakdown of points awarded to Belgium and awarded by Belgium in the first semi-final and grand final of the contest, and the breakdown of the jury voting and televoting conducted during the two shows:

Points awarded to Belgium

Points awarded by Belgium

Detailed voting results
The following members comprised the Belgian jury:
 Michel Gudanski (jury chairperson)producer
 Candice Wachelmanager, producer (jury member in semi-final 1)
 Megan Giartsinger (jury member in the final)
 Florence Hubysinger, represented Belgium in the 2011 contest as part of Witloof Bay
 Étienne Debaisieuxsinger, represented Belgium in the 2011 contest as part of Witloof Bay (jury member in semi-final 1)
 Roberto Bellarosasinger, represented Belgium in the 2013 contest (jury member in the final)
 Marc Radeletmanager, press agent, coordinator

References 

2015
Countries in the Eurovision Song Contest 2015
Eurovision